Maximum Penetration is a concert video by American noise rock band Pussy Galore, released in 1988 by Atavistic Video and Jettisoundz.

Track listing

Release history

References

External links 
 

1988 video albums
1988 live albums
Live video albums
Pussy Galore (band) albums